Kaltayevo (Qaltay) is a rural locality (a village) in Muzyakovsky Selsoviet, Krasnokamsky District, Bashkortostan, Russia. The population was 124 as of 2010. There are 5 streets.

Geography 
Kaltayevo is located 24 km northeast of Nikolo-Beryozovka (the district's administrative centre) by road. Ishmetovo is the nearest rural locality.

References 

Rural localities in Krasnokamsky District